Borgo Santa Maria is a small town located 30 km north-east of Rome. It is a hamlet belonging to the municipality of Montelibretti.

It is situated on the Via Salaria, Km 38, close to other towns as Passo Corese and Borgo Quinzio.

References

Cities and towns in Lazio
Frazioni of the Province of Rome